William John Brewer (1843 - June 19, 1878) was an American soldier who received the Medal of Honor for valor during the American Civil War.

Biography
Brewer served in the Union Army in the 2nd New York Cavalry. He received the Medal of Honor on May 3, 1865, for his actions during the Appomattox campaign.

Medal of Honor citation
Citation:

 Capture of engineer flag, Army of Northern Virginia.

See also

List of American Civil War Medal of Honor recipients: A-F

References

External links
Military Times

1843 births
1878 deaths
Union Army soldiers
United States Army Medal of Honor recipients
People of New York (state) in the American Civil War
American Civil War recipients of the Medal of Honor
People from Putnam County, New York